Luo Nan (born 1986-11-03 in Anshan, Liaoning) is a female Chinese swimmer, who competed for Team China at the 2008 Summer Olympics.

Major achievements
2001 National Games - 1st 200m breast/4 × 100 m medley relay;
2006 Asian Games - 1st 4 × 100 m medley relay, 2nd 200m breast;
2006 National Champions Tournament - 1st 100m breast;
2007 World Championships - 3rd 4 × 100 m medley relay, 5th 200m breast

References
 http://2008teamchina.olympic.cn/index.php/personview/personsen/778

1986 births
Living people
Chinese female breaststroke swimmers
Olympic swimmers of China
Sportspeople from Anshan
Swimmers at the 2008 Summer Olympics
World Aquatics Championships medalists in swimming
Swimmers from Liaoning
Medalists at the FINA World Swimming Championships (25 m)
Asian Games medalists in swimming
Swimmers at the 2006 Asian Games
Asian Games gold medalists for China
Asian Games silver medalists for China
Medalists at the 2006 Asian Games
21st-century Chinese women